Trimeresurus stejnegeri chenbihuii, commonly known as the Chen's bamboo pitviper, is a subspecies of venomous pitviper in the family Viperidae. The subspecies is endemic to Hainan Island in China.

Etymology
The specific name, chenbihuii, is in honor of Professor Bi-Hui Chen of Anhui Normal University, who is a Chinese herpetologist.

Description
The scalation of T. s. chenbihuii includes 21 rows of dorsal scales at midbody, 169-178/168-174 (160-170/167-174) ventral scales in males/females, 70-80/66-78(56-73) subcaudal scales in males/females, and 10-12 supralabial scales.

Geographic range
T. s. chenbihuii is found in China on Hainan Island on Mount Diaoluo at  elevation (Lingshui County), and on Wuzhi Mountain at  elevation (Qiongzhong County). The type locality given is "Diaoluo Shan, Lingshui Co., Hainan Prov., China; altitude about ".

References

Further reading
Zhao, Er-mi (1995). "Intraspecific classification of some Chinese snakes". Sichuan Journal of Zoology 14 (3): 107–112. (Trimeresurus stejnegeri chenbihuii, new subspecies). (in Chinese, with summary in English).
Zhao, Er-mi (1997). "Intraspecific Classification of Some Chinese Snakes". Asiatic Herpetological Research 7: 170–172.

stejnegeri chenbihuii
Reptiles of China
Endemic fauna of Hainan